S.C. Pinheiro de Loures is a Portuguese football club from the municipality of Loures, Lisbon. It was founded in 1952 and currently plays in the AF Lisboa Divisão de Honra, the fifth tier of the Portuguese football league.

Current squad

References 

Association football clubs established in 1952
Football clubs in Portugal